Which Way to the Front? is a 1970 American comedy film produced, directed by and starring Jerry Lewis, which was his first film for Warner Bros.

Plot
Brendan Byers III is a rich playboy who enlists to fight in the war against the Axis powers, but is classified 4-F.  He really wants to fight, so he enlists other 4-Fs and some loyal volunteers from his own service staff and forms his own army, financing their training and equipment. Once completed, they travel to the front in Italy, with Byers impersonating a Nazi general named Eric Kesselring.

The plan is to pull back the German lines, since the front has remained static for too long, enabling the Allies to push forward again. The mission does not go smoothly and they must overcome several obstacles, including the fiery wife of the local mayor who is the real Kesselring's lover, and the real Kesselring's involvement in an assassination attempt on Hitler.  Afterwards, they face their next mission: infiltrating the Imperial Japanese command to influence the outcome of the Battle of Kwajalein.

Cast

Production
Which Way to the Front? was filmed from November 30, 1969 through February 1, 1970 and received a G rating from the MPAA.  It marked the final film appearance for actors Joe Besser, Neil Hamilton, and Kenneth MacDonald.

Reception
The film received a "BOMB" rating in Leonard Maltin's Movie Guide in which it is described as "one of Jerry's worst." It had widespread disapproval from other critics.

Home media
Warner Archive released the film on made to order DVD in the United States on May 18, 2010.

References

External links

1970 films
1970 comedy films
Military humor in film
Films directed by Jerry Lewis
Films produced by Jerry Lewis
Films with screenplays by Dee Caruso
Films with screenplays by Gerald Gardner (scriptwriter)
Italian Campaign of World War II films
Films about the 20 July plot
Adultery in films
American comedy films
1970s English-language films
1970s American films